That Is NOT a Good Idea! is a 2013 children's picture book written and illustrated by Mo Willems. First published by Balzer + Bray, it is about a plump fowl that meets a fox, and is persuaded to follow the fox to its house in the woods, all the while being observed, as if on a movie screen, by a group of young birds that regularly shout the title words.

In 2015, Weston Woods released a film adaptation of the book, with ragtime music by Lucas Elliot Eberl, and animated by Pete List. It won the Carnegie Medal for Excellence in Children's Videos in 2016.

Reception
That is NOT a good idea! has been reviewed by a number of publications, including The Horn Book Magazine, Kirkus Reviews, and Publishers Weekly.

Awards
2014 Bank Street CBC Best Children's Book of the Year (Five to Nine) - Outstanding Merit
2014 CCBC Choice
2014 Cream of the Crop List
2014 Irma Black Award - winner

References

2013 children's books
American picture books
Books about foxes
Literature featuring anthropomorphic foxes
Balzer + Bray books